Ronald Anstuther Davidson (July 13, 1899 – July 28, 1965) was an American screenwriter. He was born in Arizona, raised in Los Angeles, and died in San Diego, California.  He was the son of Dr. Ansthuther and Alice Davidson.

He graduated from the University of California, Berkeley where he was a member of Sigma Pi fraternity and Phi Beta Kappa.

Ronald Davidson started his career as a short story writer and in 1943 was appointed as story editor for Republic Studios movie serials and some feature films. He has also written some TV films and serials and has been associate producer for some film productions.  He was a member of the Screen Writers Guild.

Screenwriter filmography 
Movie serials
The Painted Stallion (1937)
S.O.S. Coast Guard (1937)
Zorro Rides Again (1937)
The Lone Ranger (1938)
The Fighting Devil Dogs (1938)
Dick Tracy Returns (1938)
The Lone Ranger Rides Again (1939)
Daredevils of the Red Circle (1939)
Dick Tracy's G-Men (1939)
Zorro's Fighting Legion (1939) 
Drums of Fu Manchu (1940)
Adventures of Red Ryder (1940)
Mysterious Doctor Satan (1940)
Adventures of Captain Marvel (1941) 
Jungle Girl (1941)
King of the Texas Rangers (1941)
Dick Tracy vs Crime Inc (1941)
Spy Smasher (1942)
Perils of Nyoka (1942)
King of the Mounties (1942)
G-Men vs The Black Dragon (1943)
Daredevils of the West (1943)
Secret Service in Darkest Africa (1943)
The Masked Marvel (1943)
Captain America (1944)
The Tiger Woman (1944)
The Invisible Monster (1950)
Desperadoes of the West (1950)
Flying Disc Man from Mars (1950)
Don Daredevil Rides Again (1951) 
Government Agents vs Phantom Legion (1951)
Radar Men from the Moon (1952)
Zombies of the Stratosphere (1952)
Jungle Drums of Africa (1953)
Canadian Mounties vs Atomic Invaders (1953)
Trader Tom of the China Seas (1954)
Man with the Steel Whip (1954)
Panther Girl of the Kongo (1955)
King of the Carnival (1955)

Feature films 
Hi-Yo Silver (1940)
The Fighting Devil Dogs (1943) (Feature version of the 1938 serial)
Range Renegades (1948)
Triggerman (1948)
Cowboy Cavalier (1948)
The Fighting Ranger (1948)
Courtin' Trouble (1948)
Across the Rio Grande (1949)
Range Justice (1949)
Roaring Westward (1949)
Black Hills Ambush (1952)
Satan's Satellites (1958)
Missile Monsters (1958)
Zorro Rides Again (1959) (Feature version of the 1937 serial)

Story writer (feature films) 
Daredevils of the Clouds (1948)
The Young and The Brave (1963)

TV series and films
Torpedo of Doom (1966 – TV film version of Fighting Devil Dogs 1938 serial)
Sakima and the Masked Marvel (1966 – TV film version of The Masked Marvel 1943 serial)
Nyoka and the Lost Secrets of Hippocrates (1966 – TV film)
Target: Sea of China (1966 – TV film)
The Adventures of Dr. Fu Manchu (1956 – TV series) (episode: The Vengeance of Fu Manchu)
Commando Cody (1953 – TV series)

Associate producer filmography
Haunted Harbor (1944)
Zorro's Black Whip (1944)
Manhunt of Mystery Island (1945)
Federal Operator 99 (1945)
The Purple Monster Strikes (1945)
The Phantom Rider (1946)
King of the Forest Rangers (1946)
Daughter of Don Q (1946)
The Crimson Ghost (1946)
Son of Zorro (1947)
D-Day on Mars (1966) (TV – producer)

References

External links
 

1899 births
1965 deaths
American male screenwriters
Film serial crew
University of California, Berkeley alumni
20th-century American male writers
20th-century American screenwriters